Usta may refer to:

Places 
Usta, Iran, a city in Razavi Khorasan Province, Iran
Usta, South Dakota, a community in the United States
Usta Mohammad, a city in Pakistan
Usta Muhammad railway station

Rivers 
Usta (Norway)
Usta (Russia), a river in Nizhny Novgorod Oblast in Russia

Other 
Usta (name)
Usta (moth), a genus of moths
Usta art, practiced in Rajasthan, India
Usta, the original Turkish title of The Master

See also
Ustad
USTA (disambiguation)